Dysoptus argus is a species of moth in the family Arrhenophanidae. It has a wide range in lowland wet forests of the Amazonian Region of northern South America from southern Venezuela and Guyana to Peru and Brazil.

The length of the forewings is 5.5–7.2 mm for males and 10.1–12 mm for females. Adults are on wing in November and from February through June.

The larvae feed on Fomes species.

Pupa
The pupa has a length of about 8 mm and is similar to Arrhenophanes perspicilla in chaetotaxy except with SV bisetose on A3-A6. The cremasteral spines are minute and slightly
more raised and acute than in A. perspicilla.

Larval case 
The larval case has a length of about 11 mm and a maximum width of 3.5 mm. It is cylindrical with thick, tough walls which are lined internally with dense, white silk. It is covered externally with brownish, matted silk and minute plant fragments.

Etymology
The specific name is derived from the Greek argus (white), in reference to the predominantly whitish color of this species.

External links
Family Arrhenophanidae

Dysoptus
Taxa named by Donald R. Davis (entomologist)
Moths described in 2003